Lalji Verma (born 5 January 1955) is an Indian politician. Ex. Minister Uttar Pradesh government and leader of the BSP legislative assembly.

Biography 
Verma was born in the village of Mohiuddinpur, in Uttar Pradesh, India, on January 5, 1955.Verma belongs to the obc category(KURMI). He completed a Master of Science on Agricultural Science. He is an active political and social worker and a member of the Samajwadi party.

Personal life
Verma is married to Shobhawati Verma and has one son, Vikas Verma, and two daughters, Akanksha Verma, and Dr. Chhaya Verma.
His son Vikas Verma committed suicide on March 14, 2018.

Political career
Verma started his political career by involving himself in student politics. He became the general secretary of the Tanda student union in 1973. He also was the general secretary of Kulbhaskar Ashram Degree College, Allahabad from 1977 to 1978. He was member of Uttar Pradesh legislative council from July 7, 1986 to January 15, 1991. He has also been elected member of the Uttar Pradesh legislative assembly in 1991, 1996, 2002, 2007,  2017.and 2022

Positions held
Verma has held these positions so far:

State Minister (Independent Charge) for Jail from 21-09-1997 to 19-10-1997.
Minister for Public Enterprises from 03-05-2002 to 12-10-2002.
Minister for Medical Education from 13-10-2002 to 29-08-2003, 17.05.2007 to 04.02.2008 & 02.05.2008.to 11.03.2012
Minister for Handicapped Welfare from 17-05-2007 to 04-02-2008.
Acting Chairman, Questions & Reference Committee of Uttar Pradesh Legislative Council from August, 1990 to January 1991.
Acting Chairman, Questions & Reference Committee of Uttar Pradesh Legislative Assembly in 1998 -1999.
Chairman, Joint Committee on the Public Undertakings & Corporations of U.P. Legislative Assembly in 1997-1998.
Chairman, Committee on Government Assurances of U.P. Legislative Assembly in 1999-2001.
Member, Business Advisory Committee of Uttar Pradesh Legislative Assembly in 1991, 1992, 2002, 2003, 2004, 2007-2008 and 2008-2009.
Member, Panel of Presiding Members of Uttar Pradesh Legislative Assembly in 1997-1998.
Member, Questions & Reference Committee of Uttar Pradesh Legislative Assembly in 1997-1998.
Member, Rules Committee of Uttar Pradesh Legislative Assembly in 2002-2003, 2007-2008 and 2008-2009.
Member, Privilege Committee of Uttar Pradesh Legislative Assembly in 2007-2008 and 2008-2009.
Minister for Parliamentary Affairs of Uttar Pradesh in 2007.to 11.03.2012
Minister for Finance of Uttar Pradesh in 2008.to 2012

Candidate
Verma was the candidate of BSP from Sravasti for the Lok Sabha elections in 2014.

Verma was the candidate of BSP from Katehari for the Vidhan Sabha elections in 2017. Verma won the election of Vidhan Sabha from Katehari.

References 
website:Official website Lalji Verma

Living people
1955 births
Uttar Pradesh MLAs 2017–2022
Bahujan Samaj Party politicians
Janata Dal politicians
Uttar Pradesh MLAs 2022–2027